Peter or Pete Moore may refer to:

Politicians
Peter Moore (British politician) (1753–1828), English civil servant of the East India Company and politician
Peter Moore (Queensland politician) (born 1938), member of the Queensland Legislative Assembly

Sports
Peter Moore (Australian rules footballer) (born 1957), winner of the Brownlow Medal in 1979 and 1984
Peter "Bullfrog" Moore (1932–2000), Australian rugby league administrator
Peter Moore (Gaelic footballer) (1940–2010), Irish Gaelic footballer
Peter Moore (speedway rider), Australian motorcycle speedway rider

Music
Pete Moore (The Miracles), bass singer for the Motown group the Miracles
Pete Moore (composer) (1924–2013), British composer and popular music arranger
Peter J. Moore (born 1956), Canadian music producer
Peter Moore (trombonist) (born 1996), winner of BBC Young Musician of the Year in 2008

Writers
Pete Moore (science writer) (born 1962), British science writer
Peter Moore (travel author) (born 1962), Australian travel writer

Others
Peter Moore (chemist) (born 1939), professor at Yale University
Peter Moore (businessman) (born 1955), American.former president of SEGA, former Microsoft executive, former Electronic Arts executive and CEO of Liverpool Football Club
Peter Moore (serial killer) (born 1946), British serial killer
Peter G. Moore (1928–2010), British statistician
Peter Moore (town crier) (1939–2009), town crier of London
Peter Moore (priest) (1924–2000), Dean of St Albans, 1973–1993
Peter Moore, British computer consultant kidnapped in Iraq; see Foreign hostages in Iraq#United Kingdom
Peter Moore, executive producer of various television documentaries, including 638 Ways to Kill Castro
Peter Moore (The Messengers), fictional character in TV series, The Messengers
Peter Weddick Moore (1859–1934), North Carolina educator and president of Elizabeth City State University
Peter Moore (shoe designer) (1944–2022), American shoe designer for Nike, Inc. and Adidas

See also
Peter Moor (born 1991), Zimbabwean cricketer
Peter Moores (disambiguation)